The 2007–08 season of the Norwegian Premier League, the highest bandy league for men in Norway.

21 games were played, with 2 points given for wins and 1 for draws. Solberg won the league, whereas Hamar IL was relegated.

League table

References 
Table

Seasons in Norwegian bandy
2007 in bandy
2008 in bandy
Band
Band